The maple syrup event was the presence of a particular scent in New York City in the late 2000s, and the response to this smell by the residents, various media outlets, and government agencies.

History
Reports of the event are said to have begun in the fall of 2005, as first reported by Gothamist and continued sporadically into early 2009. 

New Yorkers feared the sweet smell was a form of chemical warfare. The scent was eventually traced to its source, a Frutarom Industries Ltd. factory in northern New Jersey, which was processing fenugreek seeds, commonly used in maple syrup substitutes. This source was traced through a collaborative process between the citizens of New York City, the city's 311 system, the New York City Office of Emergency Management, the New York City Department of Environmental Protection, and a working group which gathered and analyzed atmospheric data.

Popular culture
The Maple Syrup event was featured, without mentioning it by name, in "30 Rock" Season 2, Episode 6 ("Somebody to Love"), which aired on November 15, 2007. The episode begins with multiple characters (Liz, Tracy and Jack) smelling maple syrup. Jack Donaghy likens the smell to a chemical weapon called "Northrax" that the US supposedly sold to the Saudis in the 1980s, which smells just like maple syrup. This leads into the episode’s main plot, in which Liz suspects a new Middle Eastern neighbor (Fred Armisen) is a terrorist.

References 

2000s in New York City
Air pollution in New York City